Thiophene-2-acetic acid is the organosulfur compound with the formula HO2CCH2C4H3S.  Together with thiophene-3-acetic acid, it is one of two isomeric thiophene acetic acids.

Preparation and use
It is prepared from 2-acetylthiophene.  

It is a precursor to the antibiotics cephaloridine and cephalothin.

References

Thiophenes
Carboxylic acids